List of 18th-century British children's literature publishers (arranged by year of birth):

Thomas Boreman
Mary Cooper
John Newbery (1713–1767)
Elizabeth Newbery
John Marshall (publisher)
William Darton
John Harris (publisher)

See also
 Books in the United Kingdom

British children's literature